The Duelist is a 2016 Russian action adventure thriller drama film directed by Aleksey Mizgirev. The film stars Pyotr Fyodorov, Vladimir Mashkov, and Yulia Khlynina. This is the Russian third feature film produced using the IMAX format. It was released in Russia on September 29, 2016 in full IMAX.

An adventure film, with dramatic and thriller elements set against the backdrop of palaces and the noble view of the Russian capital, the movie centers on Yakovlev, a retired officer, who returns to St. Petersburg from a long exile. While in the city, he fights as a duelist’s representative. During Nineteenth-century Russian duel law allowed for a duelist to be replaced by any one person. Though Yakovlev fights for money, he also seeks honor and revenge against those who disgraced him, therein, challenging the Russian Providence.

Inspirations
The movie goes back to the novels of City mysteries, popular in the middle of the 19th century (the most famous example - Les Vrais Mystères de Paris (1844) by Eugène François Vidocq). In preparation for filming, Alex Mizgirev reviewed the movie The Duellists directed by Ridley Scott (1977) and loosely based on the novel by Joseph Conrad's Duel, which, in turn, was inspired by Pushkin's The Shot.

Plot
Set in Saint Petersburg in 1860, the story revolves around retired officer Yakovlev. A deadly shot, Yakovlev is effectively a kind of mercenary in that he is available for hire through his associate Baron Staroe to stand in for others in formal duels.

Much later in the film, flashbacks reveal that years ago an Aleut shaman has predicted he would never die, and so far that seems about right as Yakovlev wins duel after duel, wounding and more often killing noble opponents. Although duels of honor are technically illegal in Russia at the time, most people turn a blind eye to the law. The code of practice is not written down anywhere, and yet everyone knows the rules and rituals, while many participants see it as an almost mystical rite. To take part in a duel is to accept that one’s fate is ultimately in the hands of God, hence the practice of Russian roulette. 

Eventually, it turns out that all of Yakovlev’s recent duels were secretly arranged by Count Beklemishev. He is a shadowy puppet master with a grudge and designs on Princess Martha Tuchkova whose brother (Prince Tuchkov) Yakovlev is scheduled to duel with next. When attraction stirs between him and the pretty blond princess, problems arise, especially since, as the flashbacks reveal, Yakovlev has an agenda of his own.

Cast

Release
The screening was part of the 2016 Toronto International Film Festival official program.

The film was released in Russia on September 29, 2016 by Walt Disney Studios Sony Pictures Releasing (WDSSPR). It was scheduled for release in China in 2017.

Reception and Reviews

Anton Dolin noted the uniqueness of the genre of "the most intriguing of the Russian film of the year", where Saint Petersburg is represented as "city of permanent flooding", rain-drenched and mud; in this respect it resembles the works of steampunk London. According to Dolin, it is extremely rare in post-Soviet Russia the sample quality mainstream and the first ever Russian blockbuster, has earned a solid "five": at an altitude here and casting, and "brutal-rock" music, and "noble-monochrome" movie.

According to conclusion written by Andrey Plakhov: "Mizgiryov with his usual taste for brutalism produces big-budget costume author noir genre and esthetic at the same time: Petersburg is buried in dirt, the Grand Duchess sleeps with cynical mercenary and Russian nobles, who boast of a code of honor, behave if it 'brother "dashing nineties", or thugs, adventurers in the Wild West". His colleague Michael Trofimenkov saw this as a conscious debunking the myth of the beautiful and noble 'Russia which we have lost': "High Society - a flock of black brutal killers, wearing a fetish noble honor, the concept of which has already become for them a "concept". The ruling class, professing the cult of blood, sexually worshiper arms and engaged in pointless self-destruction in the duels, the right word, is not worthy of reverence to him. Around this class more trouble-free and curl performers dirty orders, intermediaries, pimps. But perhaps the nastier they titled young man with big names and a slim profile, ready to sink your best friend a knife in the back".

Western Professional reviews of the film were very few. Based on 14 reviews collected by Rotten Tomatoes, The Duelist has an overall approval rating from critics of 43% based on 14 reviews, with an average score of 5.50/10. On Metacritic, the film has a weighted average score of 55 out of 100, based on 10 critics, indicating "mixed or average reviews". The Hollywood Reporter's Leslie Felperin found the film as appropriate to compare to the "universal for any country story about social mobility issues, honor and militarism" with classic westerns, though lamented the technical imperfections ("in IMAX some of the frames darker look videotaped"). The Variety reviewer Dennis Harvey gave a moderately negative review, rated the film as "Putin's fantasy of the Russian Empire" and noting the absurdity of individual scenes and episodes.

See also
 Cinema of Russia

References

External links
 
 
 
 

2016 films
2010s Russian-language films
2010s action adventure films
2010s adventure thriller films
2010s historical drama films
2016 thriller drama films
Russian films about revenge
Films about the Russian Empire
Russian action adventure films
Russian adventure thriller films
Russian thriller drama films
Russian historical drama films
Russian historical action films
Films set in the 19th century
Films set in Saint Petersburg
Films set in the Russian Empire
Films shot in Russia
Russian swashbuckler films
Columbia Pictures films
2016 3D films
Russian 3D films
IMAX films
2016 drama films